This article contains a list of speakers of the Parliament of the French Community of Belgium.

Sources
 Official website of the Parliament of the French Community Retrieved on 2009-05-02

Politics of Belgium
Belgium, French Community Parliament